Askia Muhammad I (b. 1443 – d. 1538), born Muhammad ibn Abi Bakr al-Turi or Muhammad Ture, was the first ruler of the Askia dynasty of the Songhai Empire, reigning from 1493 to 1528. He is also known as Askia the Great, and his name in modern Songhai is Mamar Kassey. Askia Muhammad strengthened his empire and made it the largest empire in West Africa's history.  At its peak under his reign, the Songhai Empire encompassed the Hausa states as far as Kano (in present-day Northern Nigeria) and much of the territory that had belonged to the Songhai empire in the east.  His policies resulted in a rapid expansion of trade with  Europe and Asia, the creation of many schools, and the establishment of Islam as an integral part of the empire.

Muhammad was a prominent general under the Songhai ruler Sunni Ali. When Sunni Ali was succeeded by his son, Sunni Baru, in 1492, Muhammad challenged the succession on the grounds that the new ruler was not a faithful Muslim.  He defeated Baru and ascended to the throne in 1493.

Ture subsequently orchestrated a program of expansion and consolidation which extended the empire from Taghaza in the North to the borders of Yatenga in the South; and from Air in the Northeast to Futa Djallon in Guinea. Instead of organizing the empire along Islamic lines, he tempered and improved on the traditional model by instituting a system of bureaucratic government unparalleled in Western Africa. In addition, Askia established standardized trade measures and regulations, initiated the policing of trade routes and also established an organized tax system. He was overthrown by his son, Askia Musa, in 1528.

Name and title
The Tarikh al-Sudan gives Askia Muhammad's name as Muhammad ibn Abi Bakr al-Turi or al-Sillanki. The Tarikh al-Fattash gives his name as Abu Abdallah Muhammad ibn Abi Bakr. Al-Turi and al-Sillanki have been interpreted as the Soninke clan names Ture and Sila by most historians. However, Stephan Bühnen has argued that they should be interpreted as nisbas referring to ancestry from Futa Toro or Silla in the Senegal valley, and favors the possibility that his ancestors originally came from Futa Toro. 

The title Askia is of unknown origin, and had been in use since the early 13th century, if not earlier. The original pronunciation of the title is not known; in modern Songhai, it is pronounced siciya. Moroccan sources spelled the title Sukyā or Sikyā, Leo Africanus spelled it Ischia, and a contemporary Portuguese source spelled it Azquya. The Tarikh al-Sudan provides a folk etymology for the title, claiming that Askia Muhammad invented the title based on the lament of Sonni Ali's daughters when they had learned he had seized power: "a si Kiya", meaning "it is not his" or "he shall not be it".

After going on the hajj in 1497–1498, he also became known as Askia al-Hajj Muhammad.

In modern Songhai, he is known as Mamar Kassey. Mamar is a form of the name Muhammad, and Kassey is a matronymic.

Early life

Askia Muhammad was  born in Gao. His father, Baru Lum, was of Toucouleur or Soninke ancestry, with ancestors hailing from the Senegal River valley. His mother was named Kassey and is said in oral tradition to have been the sister of Sonni Ali.

Origins controversy

The theory shared on his origins nevertheless remains very controversial and has been rejected by the Songhai and especially by the modern descendants of Askia Muhammad I, who see in it a challenge to their ethnicity and also by several researchers despite a silla Toucouleur origin where Touré Soninke of Askia, his exact surname is still not determined and no oral source of the toucouleur and soninké mention any affiliation of Askia with them. One of the leaves of the tarikh evokes the title maiga of the emperor which is only used for the patrilineal kinship of the Sunni dynasty fuse you it of a non-ruling branch. The term sonhinkey which suggests a soninke ethnic origin from askia, is also the name of the clan of songhai magicians responsible for the pre-Islamic cult and forming a younger branch of the royal clan of the sunni not having the right to the throne, the oral traditions of the songhai bring the father of askia Mohammed from this clan. Omar komajago who is the brother of the askia is in no way mentioned as a Touré or a sylla. the Askia Mohammed himself during his reign led a fierce war against the Fouta Toro, especially against the leaders of the Toucouleur koli tenguela and the region was devastated by the songhai troops led by his brother Omar.
The term at-turi which is in Arabic designates more the Geographical origin of a person than his clan name and turi could be the name of the village of the father of the askia, a songhai village call Tureh in Niger in the region of Tillabéri in the Tera Department could be the turi of the tarikh. The askia Mohamed being the son of princess kassey sister of Sunni Ali Ber it is impossible that he himself came from Fouta toro and his post of general is only given to a member of the royal family in the Songhai army and an ethnic Songhai patrilineally. The theory that the askia Mohamed is an ethnic songhai of father and mother is the most plausible and is being studied by the ahmed Baba center of Timbuktu, a soninke origin where Toucouleur of the askia advanced as a theory by delafosse is not formalized nowhere and is seen as advanced in not knowing the Songhai country, its language, its toponymy and these traditions, none of these aspects were taken into account and the theory was advanced at a time when Africa was seen on a Colonial and racialist angle and its history itself seen as false.

Descent from Askia 

The Tarikh al fattash report the many descendants of Askia Muhammad who is said to amount to 471 children he had from many wives and Concubines of various origins. Just like Genghis Khan in Asia and Charlemagne in Europe, Emperor Askia Muhammad and the emperors descended from his brother Omar Komdjago constitute patrilineal or matrilineal ancestors of a significant part of the native Sahelian populations and descendants of Sahelians who extend over 6 country where the Songhai are present, their descendants are mainly linked to powerful old royal house where always according to the sahel.

Mamar Haamey 

Mamar is the nickname of Askia Muhammad and these many descendants are called mamar hamey, they are the descendants of Askia Ishaq II, Askia Nuh, Askia Muhammad V Gao who were dethroned by Moroccans after the Battle of Tondibi and the successive wars, to those add the descendants of the many ministers, governors, generals who constitute the children and grandchildren of the askia, in Mali they are scattered among their subjects and occupy the positions of village chief, and were under for some under the authority of the Moroccan arma chiefs (Gao Alkaydo of Gao, the Pasha of Timbuktu) before French colonization, only Djenne royal house, Hombori royal house and Kikara royal house have Askyanid ruler in Mali. In western Niger where the great princes migrated with all the strong lineage they founded powerful Emirates such as Dargol, Tera, Gothèye, Karma, Namaro, Sikié, Kokorou, larba Birno, Gounday next to the sunni emirs of Gorouol, Anzourou, they are constantly at war with each other and against the Tuareg ouelleminden and oudalan and the Fulani of Dori, those who mi gre further south reigns in Gaya, Bana, Tanda, Yelou, Bengou, loulami, karimama, Banikoara up to Djougou where they are in the majority and have formed the dendi where they are mixed and reign over the Bariba, Yoruba, Gur, Mandé, Yom, their arrival at the Dendi (province) triggers the assimilation of non-Songhai populations to the Songhai culture and language and an Islamization of the bargou, they are in Niger integrated with the Za and Sunni with the ethnic name Zarma, the most notable are the Emir Oumarou karma who fought against French colonization, Gabelinga Hama Kassa the military leader of goundey allied with wangugnya issa korombeyze moodi the mother of the war of zarmatarey during the wars against the caliphate of sokoto, they joined Babatu in Gurunsi and Dagbon to conquer the Upper Volta and the Northern Territories of the Gold Coast. The three members of the three dynasties on arrival Colonial was associated with the non-royal clans, their attached religious clans and their freedmen to form 1/4 of the Songhai population, 3/4 being made up of the servile mass that they had at their service. The Mamar haamey considering themselves uncles of the Djermas  never enter into conflict with them and join forces with them to beat the sokoto, the Toucouleur, the Fulani of Dori and boboye and the Tuaregs.
In Burkina they are overwhelmed by the Fulani and Tuareg masses and many were ethnically assimilated by the Fulani, they are in Darkoye, Markoye and Gorom Gorom with the Sunni.

The descendants of the askia like that of sunni carry the title of Maiga associated with imperial power.

Songhai Djermas 

The descendants of the Askia are also to be found mainly among the Songhai subgroup of the Djermas descending from the previous Za Dynasty of the Sunni Dynasty and Askia Dynasty and who ruled over the Gao Empire, the marriages between the members descending from the three powerful songhai dynasty was frequent and the princesses of blood and noble milk were only exchanged between these three dynasty, thus khaman Duksa, Zarmakoy sambo (Mali Bero) and Tagour Gana of the 17th and 18th century descendants of the za all took wives from the descendants of the askia living with them in the dendi, the askia reigning in the dendi on the right bank of the river and the royal Za lineage  of the waazi, sega, fahmey, kogori, kandi, Manay, Zem on the left bank, they bear the royal title of Djermakoy which does not It is to bear that to the descendant of the za, he reigns in the zarmaganda (Tondikiwindi, Ouallam, Simiri ) over the kalley and in the zarmatarey (Dosso, kiota, yeni, Fakara, kouré, Kollo, libore, N'Dounga, kirtachi, babousaye, Tondikandia, bogole, Hamdallaye, Garankedey, Fabidji ) over the Gooley. The Maouri ( Royale house of Mawrikoy of sokorbe and Mawrikoy of Moussadey), Gubey (Royale house of goubekoy of Loga) assimilated and having constituted royal houses married to the za.

Matrimonial relations between the askia and the za are the basis of cousinhood between the Songhai djermas and the Songhai Mamar Hamey. The Mamar Haamey consider themselves the maternal uncles of the Zarma, the same relationship is observed with the descendants of the Sunni Ali Ber .

The descendants of the Za Dynasty have always occupied high positions in the empire in the Army and the administration, especially in the military province of dendi, where they held the position of Dendi Fari and their role was decisive in stopping the advance Moroccan in the dendi with generals of values like Hawa ize maali and yefarma ishak of the house of Manay.
the Mamar Hamay occupy two djerma kingdoms by imposition during the French colonization in Niger, the French massacre to the last the royal house of the Zarmakoy of Ouallam and bring in a Mamar Haama from Hombori to occupy the vacant throne, same case in the Fakara where a mamar haama is imported from Yonkoto to occupy the throne, all within the framework of the armed revolt of mamar haama oumarou emir of karma against the Colonial administration, the saying between songhai  we are only one family that will chew each other but never swallow each other is used so that the populations of these two principalities accept the taxes. the Songhai do not have a problem when an ethnic Songhai comes to usurp a throne from them but this revolts in the case of a non-Songhai and leaves the country when they cannot prevent the unknown .

The Djerma, the mamar hamey and the si hamey all qualify as zaberbenda (the descendants of za the great, za el ayaman) and must support each other in the event of an enemy attack, when the mamar haama are attacked on the right bank, the Tubal War drum are struck to warn the left bank where the Djerma princes are beating theirs to gather their armies and cross the river to support their brother in the west and vice versa.

Hausa land 

Askia Mohamed I is the maternal ancestor of the Hausa Sultans of the Bagauda Dynasty of through his daughter Awah married to Muhammad Rumfa Sultan of Kano during the conquest of the Hausa Kingdoms by the Songhai Empire, the are replaced by the Fulani Sullubawa clan Dabo Dynasty during the conquest of kano by the Sokoto caliphate, having many daughters the askia contracted diplomatic marriages with the kings subject to his power to ensure their loyalty, kano is certainly not the only Hausa state where this kind relationships were established.

All Hausa descendants of Muhammad rumfa sultan of kano are in matrilineal line descendant of askia.

Others 

The Arma who come from the marriage between the Spanish soldiers of Morocco and the Songhaiwomen are also in matrilineal line descending from the Askiya for the most part.

Throughout the Central Sahel, the descendants in patrilineal or matrilineal line of the askia can be around Million drawn from the ethnic Songhai which amounts to nearly 11 million people and possible descendants among the Hausa, The Fula and there are generally only than associated with royal houses.
The pyramidal Tomb of Askia located in Gao has not been the subject of any excavation to examine his remains in order to carry out genetic examinations and these known descendants have no longer been the subject of study, only a genetic study can confirm the historical connection.

Are sons the Askia Dawud also had Total 333 children according to the Tarikh al-Sudan  while the Tarikh al-Fattash has 61 children, 30 of whom died at a young age.
the many princes died for the most part young because of the assassinations that occurred during the successions to the imperial throne, especially with the emperors Askia Musa the eldest of the sons of the askia born of his Dahomean concubine who carried out a coup and murdered a good number of these brothers and 25 to 35 of these cousins.

The successions on the imperial Songhai throne are generally preceded by a battle between the princes, the strongest generally takes power, it is this instability which favored the Moroccan invasion and the defeat of Tondibi due to a weak contribution of troops resulting from the cold between the emperor Ishaq II and the balama of the kurmina.

Legacy
Askia encouraged learning and literacy, ensuring that Songhai's universities produced the most distinguished scholars, many of whom published significant books and one of which was his nephew and friend Mahmud Kati. To secure the legitimacy of his usurpation of the Sonni dynasty, Askia Muhammad allied himself with the scholars of Timbuktu, ushering in a golden age in the city for scientific and Muslim scholarship. The eminent scholar Ahmed Baba, for example, produced books on Islamic law which are still in use today. Muhammad Kati published Tarikh al-fattash and Abdul-Rahman as-Sadi published Tarikh al-Sudan (Chronicle of The Black Land), two history books which are indispensable to present-day scholars reconstructing African history in the Middle Ages.
The king's supposed tomb, the Tomb of Askia, is now a UNESCO World Heritage Site.

In popular culture
 The Nigerien musical group Mamar Kassey is named after Askia Muhammad.
 In the turn-based strategy game Sid Meier's Civilization V, Askia Muhammad is depicted as the leader of the Songhai civilization, one of the playable factions.

See also 
 Legends of Africa

Footnotes

References

Primary sources

, translated in

Other sources

External links
Kingdoms of the Medieval Sudan – Xavier University
Ancient African Legends

1440s births
1538 deaths
16th-century monarchs in Africa
15th-century monarchs in Africa
People of the Songhai Empire
History of Mali
History of Niger
16th-century Muslims
Year of birth uncertain